Tal is an album by American jazz guitarist Tal Farlow, released in 1956.

Originally released on Norman Granz's Norgran label, it was subsequently released by Verve. It has been reissued by Verve again in 2001 and also on Universal Japan.

Track listing
"Isn't It Romantic?" (Richard Rodgers, Lorenz Hart) – 10:15
"There Is No Greater Love" (Isham Jones, Marty Symes) – 4:00
"How About You?" (Burton Lane, Ralph Freed) – 6:06
"Anything Goes" (Cole Porter) – 5:12
"Yesterdays" (Jerome Kern, Otto Harbach) – 5:56
"You Don't Know What Love Is" (Gene de Paul, Don Raye) – 4:24
"Chuckles" (Clark Terry) – 5:00
"Broadway" (Billy Bird, Teddy McRae, Henri Woode) – 6:19

Personnel
Tal Farlow – guitar
Eddie Costa – piano
Vinnie Burke – bass
Production notes:
Norman Granz – producer
Hiroshi Itsuno – reissue preparation
Herman Leonard – cover photo
Kikuo Niikura – mastering

References

Tal Farlow albums
1956 albums
Albums produced by Norman Granz
Norgran Records albums
Verve Records albums
Universal Music Japan albums